Campos Atlético Associação is a Brazilian football team from Campos dos Goytacazes, Rio de Janeiro State.

History
Created by idealization of Wanderley Barreto its first president, coming up with the name of Campos Athletic Association. Was champion in Campeonato Campista the years 1918, 1924, 1932, 1956 and 1976, in addition to the Rio de Janeiro Zona Norte Championship in 1956, which was not disputed in the field but that must have the title recognized by the current federation. There is also the conquest of the title of champion of the Zona Norte and Rio de Janeiro in the year 1976.

In 2015, he returned to professional football, to compete in the Série C of the Campeonato Carioca and getting access and with it playing the Série B. In 2016 rose to the First Division in Carioca by winning in the Triangular Final of Série B.

Achievements
Campeonato da Cidade de Campos (Campos City Championship): 5
1918, 1924, 1932, 1956, 1976

References

External links
 Official website

Association football clubs established in 1912
Football clubs in Rio de Janeiro (state)
1912 establishments in Brazil